1869 may refer to:

the year 1869 AD
the number 1869, see 1869 (number)
1869 - a computer game